This article lists songs about Miami, set there, or named after a location or feature of the city.

It is not intended to include songs where Miami is simply named along with various other cities.

Songs about Miami
"Cruisin' (In Miami)" by The Lord 2022
"Moon Over Miami" by Eddie Duchin 1935
"Miami 2017 (Seen the Lights Go Out on Broadway)" by Billy Joel 1976
"Smuggler's Blues" by Glenn Frey, blues rock, video inspired an episode of Miami Vice, 1984 (#12 on Billboard Hot 100)
"You Belong To The City" by Glenn Frey 
"Ice Ice Baby" by Vanilla Ice ("Miami's on the scene...My town, that created all the bass sound"), (#1 on Billboard Hot 100 in 1990)
"Seminole Wind" by John Anderson (#2 on Hot Country Songs), video filmed in the Everglades, 1992 
"Everybody's Got a Cousin in Miami" by Jimmy Buffett from Fruitcakes 1994
"Miami" by Will Smith ("Bienvenido a Miami") 1998*
"Miami" by Counting Crows 2002
"Miami" by Against Me! from Searching for a Former Clarity 2005
"This is Miami" by Dutch DJ Sander Kleinenberg 2006
"Defend Dade" by DJ Khaled ft. Pitbull and Casely, from We Global 2008
"I'm in Miami Bitch" by LMFAO on the album Party Rock (#7 on UK Dance Chart) 2008
"We Already Won" Flo Rida 2010
"Miami 2 Ibiza" by Swedish House Mafia & Tinie Tempah (#1 on Dance Club Songs chart) 2010*
"Move to Miami" by Enrique Iglesias ft. Pitbull (#5 on Dance Club Songs Chart) 2018
"Señorita (Shawn Mendes and Camila Cabello song) (#1 on Billboard Hot 100) 2019
"Miami" by John Mellencamp (on John Cougar album)
"Miami" by Bob Seger on the album Like a Rock 1986
"Miami" by U2 on the album Pop
"Miami" by Randy Newman (on Trouble in Paradise) 
"Only in Miami" by Bette Midler
"Going Back to Miami", written by Wayne Cochran, made famous by The Blues Brothers
"Miami, My Amy" by Keith Whitley country pop, 1986
"The New South" by Hank Williams Jr.
"If the South Woulda Won" by Hank Williams Jr.
"The Road Goes On Forever" The Highwaymen (country supergroup)
"Miami" by Taking Back Sunday
"Miami" by British band Foals
"Swimming In Miami" by Owl City
"Miami Pop" by Phil Fuldner
"Miami" by Taylor Grey
"Miami Beach" by Brazilian group Bonde do Rolê on the album Marina Gasolina EP
"Miami is the Place for Me" by Big Money Jon
"Welcome to Miami" by Pitbull 2002*
"Miami" by Yo Gotti
"Miami Nights" by Wale
"Summer Wit' Miami" by Jim Jones
"Miami" by K'Jon
"Everybody loves Miami" by Germany's The Underdog Project
"Miami" by Australian band The Church from Further/Deeper 2014
"Amiami" by French singer Philippe Katerine from  2013
"Hully Gully Baby" by The Dovells
"" by Max Pezzali 2019
"Dear Miami" by Róisín Murphy 2007
"Otro Noche En Miami" by Bad Bunny 2018
"Wild Wild Love" by Pitbull ft. G.R.L (When it comes to Miami, I always represent...) 2014

 * means music video is filmed in Miami

See also

 Music of Miami

References

Further reading
 
 

Miami
Culture of Miami
 Miami
Miami-related lists